The Prix Courteline is a French prize rewarding cinematic humour, named in tribute to Georges Courteline (1858-1929). It was founded in 1930 by Roland Dorgelès. It was originally awarded every two years.

Winners
1930 : Marcel Andrys
1932 : Marcel Sauvage
1934 : Gabriel Chevallier
1936 : André Sevry
1938 : Marcel E. Grancher
1942 : Clément Richer
1944 : Jean Fougère
1946 : Marc Blancpain
1948 : Maurice Toesca
1950 : Jean Dutourd
1953 : Paul Guth
1957 : Roger Rabiniaux
1958 : Nicole de Buron
1961 : Bourvil
1962 : Marcel E. Grancher
1963 : André Couteaux
1964 : Bourvil et Fernandel
1965 : Annie Girardot
1967 : Louis de Funès
1972 : Marcel Mithois
1974 : Michel Audiard
1978 : Guy Foissy
1983 : Éric Westphal
1992 : Jacques Pessis
1999 : Laurent Ruquier

References

External links
 Bourvil lauréat du prix Courteline
 De Funès lauréat du prix Courteline

Courteline